Pleroma (literally "fullness") generally refers to the totality of divine powers. It is used in Christian theological contexts, especially in Gnosticism. The term also appears in the Epistle to the Colossians, which is traditionally attributed to Paul the Apostle. The word is used 17 times in the New Testament.

Etymology 

Christianity

New Testament
The word itself is a relative term, capable of many shades of meaning, according to the subject with which it is joined and the antithesis to which it is contrasted. It denotes the result of the action of the verb pleroun; but pleroun is either 
to fill up an empty thing (e.g. ), or 
to complete an incomplete thing (e.g. );

and the verbal substantive in -ma may express either

the objective accusative after the verb, 'the thing filled or completed,' or 
 the cognate accusative, 'the state of fulness or completion, the fulfilment, the full amount,' resulting from the action of the verb.

It may emphasize totality in contrast to its constituent parts; or fullness in contrast to emptiness (kenoma); or completeness in contrast to incompleteness or deficiency.

A further ambiguity arises when it is joined with a genitive, which may be either subjective or objective, the fulness which one thing gives to another, or that which it receives from another.

Cf. Here the genitive is perhaps subjective—the fulness of Christ, His full embodiment, that fulness which He supplies to the Church—emphasizing the thoroughness with which the Church is the receptacle of His powers and represents Him on earth. The analogy of the other uses of the word with the genitive of the person, and the stress throughout these books on Christians being filled by Christ, favours this view. But the genitive may be objective, 'the complement of Christ,' that which completes Him, which fills up by its activities the work which His withdrawal to heaven would have left undone, as the body completes the head. The former view has been most common since the thorough examination of the word by Fritzsche and Lightfoot (Col.), and was taken by von Soden (Hand-Comm.). But the latter view, which was that of Origen and Chrysostom, has been strongly advocated by Pfleiderer, and T. K. Abbott (International Critical Comm.).

Outside the NT the word occurs in Ignatius in a sense which is clearly influenced by the NT, and apparently in the meaning of the Divine fulness, as going forth and blessing and residing in the Church (Eph. Inscr. , and Trall. Inscr. , almost = en Christo).

Gnosticism

In Gnosticism the use becomes yet more stereotyped and technical, though its applications are still very variable. The Gnostic writers appeal to the use in the NT (e.g. Iren I. iii. 4), and the word retains from it the sense of totality in contrast to the constituent parts; but the chief associations of pleroma in their systems are with Greek philosophy, and the main thought is that of a state of completeness in contrast to deficiency (Iren. I. xvi. 3; Hippol. vi. 31), or of the fullness of real existence in contrast to the empty void and unreality of mere phenomena (kenoma, Iren. I. iv. 1). Thus in Cerinthus it expressed the fulness of the Divine Life out of which the Divine Christ descended upon the man Jesus at his baptism, and into which He returned (Iren. I. xxvi. 1, III. xi. 1, xvi. 1). In the Valentinian system it stands in antithesis to the essential incomprehensible Godhead, as 'the circle of the Divine attributes,' the various means by which God reveals Himself: it is the totality of the thirty aeons or emanations which proceed from God, but are separated alike from Him and from the material universe. It is at times almost localized, so that a thing is spoken of as 'within,' 'without,' 'above,' 'below' the Pleroma: more often it is the spirit-world, the archetypal ideal existing in the invisible heavens in contrast to the imperfect phenomenal manifestations of that ideal in the universe. Thus 'the whole Pleroma of the aeons' contributes each its own excellence to the historic Jesus, and He appears on earth 'as the perfect beauty and star of the Pleroma' (Iren. I. xi. 6). Similarly it was used by writers as equivalent to the full completeness of perfect knowledge (Pistis Sophia, p. 15).

Again, each separate aeon is called a pleroma in contrast to its earthly imperfect counterpart, so that in this sense the plural can be used, pleromata (Iren. I. xiv. 2); and even each individual has his or her Pleroma or spiritual counterpart (to pleroma autes of the Samaritan woman,—Heracleon, ap. Origen, xiii. p. 205).

It thus expressed the various thoughts which we should express by the Godhead, the ideal, heaven; and it is probably owing to this ambiguity, as well as to its heretical associations, that the word dropped out of Christian theology. It is still used in its ordinary untechnical meaning, e.g. Theophylact speaks of the Trinity as pleroma tou theou; but no use so technical as that in Ignatius reappears.

Diagram of the Pleroma

Neoplatonism
In a neoplatonic manifestation of the concept, John M. Dillon, in Pleroma and Noetic Cosmos: A Comparative Study, states that Gnosticism imported its concept of the ideal realm, or pleroma, from Plato's concept of the cosmos and Demiurge in Timaeus and of Philo's Noetic cosmos in contrast to the aesthetic cosmos. Dillon does this by contrasting the Noetic cosmos to passages from the Nag Hammadi, where the aeons are expressed as the thoughts of God. Dillon expresses the concept that pleroma is a Gnostic adaptation of Hellenic ideas, since before Philo there is no Jewish tradition that accepts that the material world or cosmos was based on an ideal world that exists as well.

Social sciences

Carl Jung
Carl Jung used the word in his mystical work, Seven Sermons to the Dead, first published anonymously in 1916, and the only part of Liber Novus (The Red Book) to be published before his death. According to Jung, the pleroma is the totality of all opposites.

Gregory Bateson
In his Steps to an Ecology of Mind, Gregory Bateson adopts and extends Jung's distinction between pleroma (the non-living world that is undifferentiated by subjectivity) and creatura (the living world, subject to perceptual difference, distinction, and information). What Bateson calls the "myth of power" is the epistemologically false application to Creatura of an element of Pleroma (non-living, undifferentiated).

See also
Absolute (philosophy)
Aeon (Gnosticism)
Ein Sof
Empyrean
Neoplatonism and Gnosticism
Principle of plenitude
World of Light

References

Bibliography

Attribution

New Testament Greek words and phrases
Gnosticism
Carl Jung